Bluegrass at Carnegie Hall is an album of studio recordings by the progressive bluegrass band The Country Gentlemen, released in 1962 on the Starday label and reissued in 1988. The only thing about this album that has anything to do with Carnegie Hall is the cover photo on the original Starday LP, showing the group on stage (not the photo on the right). Nevertheless, there are many classic tunes on the album from the group's Starday era. As for the actual Carnegie Hall concert, there are six cuts on the Smithsonian Folkways CD "The Country Gentlemen: On the Road"(SFW40133), which include the fine dobro playing of Kenny Haddock.

Critical reception

Thom Owens of Allmusic gave the album four and half stars out of five, and described it as "a collection of excellent studio recordings... that rank among their finest early recordings."

Track listing 
 "I Know I've Lost You" – 3:03
 "Nobody's Business" (Idol, Reed) – 2:10
 "Down Where the Still Waters Flow" – 3:53
 "Country Concert" – 2:23
 "A Letter to Tom" (Duffey) – 3:00
 "Two Little Boys" (trad.) – 3:12
 "These Men of God" – 2:18
 "Red Rockin' Chair" – 2:06
 "I'll Never Marry" – 2:52
 "Willie Roy, the Crippled Boy" – 3:58
 "Sunrise" (Rypdal) – 3:15
 "Silence of Tears" – 2:41
 "New Freedom Bell" (Osborne) – 2:29
 "The Church Back Home" – 2:30

Personnel 
 Charlie Waller - guitar, vocals
 John Duffey - mandolin, vocals
 Eddie Adcock - banjo, vocals
 Tom Gray - bass, vocals

References 

1962 albums
The Country Gentlemen albums
Hollywood Records albums
Starday Records albums
Albums produced by Charlie Waller (American musician)
Albums produced by John Duffey
Albums produced by Eddie Adcock
Albums produced by Tom Gray